The Bashan 125R is a 125cc 4-stroke, sport bike and commuter type motorcycle manufactured by Bashan Motorcycle Manufacturing Co.Ltd in Chongqing, a major city in southwestern mainland China. Chongqing is the third largest centre of motor vehicle production and the largest for motorcycles.

Using the same frame as the Honda CBR125R and CBR150, the Bashan 125R has interchangeable parts with its Honda counterparts, making it possible to mount aftermarket fairings and accessories from the CBR125/150.

References

 https://web.archive.org/web/20110503054042/http://www.jonway.co.za/road-bikes/bashan.php 
 http://en.bashanglobal.com/product_show.aspx?id=106 - Bashan BS-150 Product Page (Original Import)
 http://www.jonway.co.za - Jonway SA (Importer)
 https://web.archive.org/web/20100307060254/http://en.bashanglobal.com/ - Bashan Motorcycles (Manufacturer)

Sport bikes
Motorcycles of China
Motorcycles introduced in 2010